Mohamed Brahimi (20 January 1970) is a retired Algerian football striker. He was best goal scorer of the Algerian First league 1995-1996 with 14 goals.

References

1970 births
Living people
Algerian footballers
WA Tlemcen players
Algerian Ligue Professionnelle 1 players
Algeria international footballers
Association football forwards
21st-century Algerian people